The 1962 All-Ireland Senior Football Championship was the 76th staging of All-Ireland Senior Football Championship, the Gaelic Athletic Association's premier inter-county Gaelic football tournament. The championship began on 29 April 1962 and ended on 23 September 1962.

Games were shown on television for the first time ever.

Down entered the championship as the defending champions, however, they were defeated by Cavan in the Ulster final.

Kerry won their twentieth All-Ireland title.

Results

Connacht Senior Football Championship

Quarter-finals

Semi-finals

Final

Leinster Senior Football Championship

First round

 
 
 
  
Quarter-finals

 

Semi-finals

Final

Munster Senior Football Championship

Quarter-final

Semi-finals

 

Final

Ulster Senior Football Championship

Preliminary round

Quarter-finals

Semi-finals

Final

All-Ireland Senior Football Championship

Semi-finals

Final

Championship statistics

Miscellaneous

 Sligo beat Mayo for the first time since 1928.
 Football matches were shown on Television for the first time ever.
 Garry McMahon of Kerry scored the fastest goal ever in an All-Ireland final when he found the net after just 34 seconds against Roscommon.
 The All-Ireland final between Kerry and Roscommon becomes the first championship game to be broadcast live on Telefís Éireann.

Scorers
Overall

Single game

References